B. Satiananthan  is a Malaysian football coach and former player. He is currently the head coach of Malaysia Super League club Sarawak United. He formerly coached the Malaysia national football team and the Malaysia national under-23 football team.

Career
As a player in attacking midfielfder, he had played with NSCRC (Negeri Sembilan Chinese Recreation Club), Negeri Sembilan FA and Malacca FA. He also was part of the Malaysia squad that won bronze medal at the 1983 Sea Games. In 1988, he became Negeri Sembilan skipper at centre-back.

Early in his career in coaching, he coached Negeri Sembilan FA. He held the assistant coach position for the national Olympic team between 1997-1999 and 2002–2004. He was also the assistant head coach at MPPJ FC in 2006 until the dissolution of the club and acting as the interim head coach for a short period after Michael Feichtenbeiner was relieved of his job.

In 2006, he was selected by the Football Association of Malaysia to be the head coach for the Malaysia under-23 side in preparation for the 2008 Summer Olympics qualifiers. After winning the 2007 Merdeka Tournament, he was selected as the head coach for the senior team by FAM president Sultan Haji Ahmad Shah.

His first match as the team's head coach was in the 2010 FIFA World Cup qualifiers against Bahrain. In the match, Malaysia lost 4-1 before drawing 0–0 at Shah Alam. After the World Cup 2010 qualifying campaign ended, he then brought the under-23 side to the 2007 SEA Games in Thailand, without any success after only managing 1 win, 1 draw and 1 defeat and for the first time since 1999, Malaysia failed to advance into the semi-finals.

For 2008, Sathianathan brought the Malaysia XI to face Premier League giants Chelsea. Eventually, the match was won 2-0 by Chelsea and the squads did well in the match as Chelsea head coach Luiz Felipe Scolari praised the Malaysian team.

In the 2008 Merdeka Tournament, Sathianathan again brought Malaysia into the final. Malaysia showed impressive performances from the start of the tournament and did not concede in all of their matches. However Sathianathan's side lost 6-5 in a penalty shoot-out against Vietnam in the final.

In 2008 AFF Suzuki Cup, the Malaysian team started well with a convincing win over Laos. However, in the last two matches, his team lost 2–3 to Vietnam and beaten by host Thailand 3–0. The lost against the Thais saw Malaysia exit the competition from the group stage for the first time since 1998. Rumours also spread that he will be replaced by Indonesia's former coach, Peter Withe because of his failures. However, the FAM decided to extend his contract for one more year with a condition that he must improve Malaysia's FIFA ranking.

In February 2009, Sathianathan's one-year contract was terminated by the FAM, after Malaysia was thrashed 5-0 by United Arab Emirates in a 2011 AFC Asian Cup qualification match. Subsequently, he coached Kelantan FA from November 2009 and guided the team to win the 2010 Malaysia Cup. He was forced to leave his post after being handed a 6-month coaching ban by FAM from January 2011 for criticising the national football body and later became the CEO of Kelantan FA.

He was appointed as the coach of ATM FA in November 2011. Under Sathianathan's leadership, ATM won the 2012 Malaysia Premier League, and an automatic promotion to the 2013 Malaysia Super League. Sathianathan succeeded in maintaining ATM as a Super League team for 3 seasons and also a finalist of the 2013 Malaysia Cup, until he was relieved from his duties in April 2015.

Sathianathan were announced as the new Felda United F.C. head coach in February 2017. Under his helm, Felda secured 3rd place in the 2017 Malaysia Super League and reached the semi-finals of the 2017 Malaysia Cup. He won the Super League's Best Coach award in that season. Even though Felda was relegated for failing to acquire a Super League license for the next season, Sathianathan succeeded in guiding the team to win the 2018 Malaysia Premier League and promotion back to Super League at the first attempt. After Felda's 2018 Malaysia Cup journey ended in the quarter-finals and a restructuring of the club management, Sathianathan announced that he will not continue coaching the team after the end of his contract that year.

On 22 November 2018, Sathianathan was announced as Selangor FA's new head coach. The announcement was made official the next day, in a live session with Sathianathan via Selangor's official Facebook page.

On 21 September 2020, Sathianathan was sacked by Selangor due to a string of poor results after the Malaysian Super League resumed.

Personal life and views
Regarding the continuation of playing in the Malaysia Football League throughout the Ramadan fasting period, he mentioned that "Football leagues in Arabian countries (where the Muslim population are greater than Malaysia) also don’t stop during Ramadan. In fact, the festivities and spirit are felt on the pitch too", as reported by Fox Sports Asia in an article.

Honours

Negeri Sembilan
Champions 1992 Sultan's Gold Cup

Malaysia U-23
Champions 2007 Merdeka Tournament
Runners-up 2008 Merdeka Tournament

Kelantan FA
Champions 2010 Malaysia Cup

ATM FA
Champions 2012 Malaysia Premier League

Felda United FC
Champions 2018 Malaysia Premier League

Individual
National Football Award
Best Coach: 2010, 2012, 2017

References

External links
B. Sathianathan info at www.arsenalschoolsmalaysia.com

Living people
Malaysian people of Indian descent
Negeri Sembilan FA players
Malaysian football managers
Kelantan FA managers
1958 births
Tamil sportspeople
Malaysian Hindus
Malaysia national football team managers